Ponte Vella (Galician, "old bridge", Ponte Romana (Roman bridge), Ponte Maior (great bridge)) is a medieval footbridge built on Roman foundations in Ourense, Spain. Located at the intersection of N120 and Rua Progreso, it spans the Minho River. At one time, it was considered to be the biggest bridge in all of Spain.

Geography
The bridge is situated in front of a chapel, connecting Ourense and Santiago de Compostela. The Ponte Maior was the only access across the Minho River until another bridge was constructed in 1816, while Ponte Milenio, a modern bridge, was built later in the millennium.

History
The original bridge across the Minho River was built during the first century rule of Emperor Augustus though other sources state that it was built during the Trajan period. A mention is made of this bridge in the will of Doña Urraca, where it is said that it was repaired with funds provided by Ferdinand III. From the Middle Ages, it has provided access to the city of Ourense for trade and pilgrimage. The structure was rebuilt in 1230 by Bishop Lorenzo on Roman foundations (original piers), and repaired in 1449 by Bishop Pedro de Silva.

See also 
 List of Roman bridges
 Roman architecture
 Roman engineering

References

Buildings and structures completed in 1230
Bridges in Galicia (Spain)
Pedestrian bridges in Spain
Ourense
Bridges completed in the 13th century
Minho (river)